Snafu Comics is a webcomics site maintained by David Stanworth. It serves as the home of several comics, including Stanworth's own creations, as well as those of other artists.

Comics

Comics by Stanworth

Snafu Comics 
This is Stanworth's original series, which is video-game-themed. The content and art style have changed over time; Stanworth says he alters it "every week."

Comics by Bleedman

PowerPuff Girls Doujinshi 
A sequel that takes place 5 years after the original Powerpuff Girls. This comic was the "Outstanding Superhero Comic" and "Outstanding Character Art" winner on the Web Cartoonist's Choice Awards in 2005.

References

External links

Official Website
Author's Art site
MySpace Page for Snafu Comics
Interview with David "Snafu" Stanworth
Review of Sugar Bits, ComixTalk, September 2008
Bleedman en Español
Comic Booked's review of PPGD, April 2012

2000s webcomics
Parody webcomics
Video game webcomics
Original English-language manga
Anime and manga inspired webcomics
Web Cartoonists' Choice Award winners
2009 comics debuts
American webcomics